The New Repertory Theatre (New Rep) is a Boston-area regional theater company founded in 1984, it has produced more than 70 East Coast, US, or World premieres. Since 2005 New Rep has been the resident company at the Mosesian Center for the Arts in Watertown, MA. It creates productions for the 340-seat Main Stage Theater, the 90-seat Black Box Theater, and its outreach program, New Rep Classic Repertory Company, performs for over 14,000 students, many from underserved communities, each year. In 2019, Michael J. Bobbitt was appointed as executive artistic director. In April 2021, New Rep named M. Bevin O’Gara its interim executive artistic director, as Bobbitt moved to the position of executive director for the Massachusetts Cultural Council.

New Rep's Next Voices Playwriting Fellowship sponsors playwrights each year to develop new work. Recent fellows include Walt McGough, John Minigan, Ellen O'Brien, Lila Rose Kaplan, and Patrick Gabridge. In 2020, during the COVID-19 Pandemic, New Rep transitioned from live to virtual performaces and later the next year featured outdoor performances at the Arsenal on the Charles. In July 2021, the theatre announced it would be suspending operations due to pandemic related challenges. In 2022, the company announced it would be producing two shows for the 2022 season; We Celebrate: Storytelling through Song, Music, and Sound at the Mosesian Center Main Stage, and Solo Moments in New Reps Black Box Theater.

References

External links
 

Theatre companies in Massachusetts
Regional theatre in the United States
Watertown, Massachusetts